Abazu was according to the Assyrian King List (AKL) the 13th Assyrian monarch, ruling in Assyria's early period, though he is not attested in any known contemporary artefacts. He is listed among the "seventeen kings who lived in tents" on the Mesopotamian Chronicles. According to the Mesopotamian Chronicles, Abazu was preceded by Nuabu. Abazu is succeeded by Belu on the Mesopotamian Chronicles.

See also

 Timeline of the Assyrian Empire
 Early Period of Assyria
 List of Assyrian kings
 Assyrian continuity
 Assyrian people
 Assyria

References

23rd-century BC Assyrian kings